Kakani is a Gaunpalika and former village development committee in Nuwakot District in Bagmati Province of central Nepal. At the time of the 1991 Nepal census, the Kakani village development committee administered a population of 7816 living in 1343 individual households.

As one of the most accessible settlements from Kathmandu over 2000 meters, this hill station hosts a British Gurkhas welfare bungalow and a number of hotels.  The village is also home to a memorial park to the victims of Thai Airways International Flight 311.

A notable local industry is strawberry farming.  With the assistance of a United Nations Development Programme project, a local farmers' cooperative now produces close to 250 000 kg of the fruit per year.

Ward office of Kakani 
For the easiness of local people Nepal Government have formed a Kakani Rural Municipality by collapsing the former Village development committee. The Rural municipality has 8 Ward and each ward has an elected body to serve the people. Here are the list of ward and their office.

Ward No 1: Okharpauwa
Ward No 2: Okharpauwa 
Ward No 3: Chauthe 
Ward No 4: Kakani 
Ward No 5: Kakani 
Ward No 6: Madanpur, Nuwakot 
Ward No 7: Chaturale 
Ward No 8: Thansing

Road to Kakani 

There is a Pasang lamu Highway that goes through the Kakani. It starts from Kathmandu and reach up to the Border of China Kerung. The road is now under construction, Because they are upgrading the road and making it wider. The Road connection of Kakani is very poor..

See also
Sisdol landfill- the biggest landfill site of Nepal located in Kakani

References

External links
UN map of the municipalities of Nuwakot District

Populated places in Nuwakot District
Rural municipalities in Nuwakot District
Rural municipalities of Nepal established in 2017